was a Japanese actress, best known to Western audiences for her portrayal of Mariko in the 1980 miniseries Shōgun.

Shogun miniseries
Shimada was the only female member of Shōguns massive cast of Japanese actors shown speaking English, for which she relied on a dialogue coach, as she was not fluent in the language at the time. Her English improved greatly during the production, however, allowing her to work in a few English language films during the 1980s and 1990s. In 1981, she won the Golden Globe Award for Best Actress – Television Series Drama, and was nominated for a Primetime Emmy Award for Outstanding Lead Actress in a Limited or Anthology Series or Movie for her work on Shōgun. While the nine-hour long Shōgun was a critical success in the U.S., it flopped in Japan when it was released as a severely truncated theatrical version.

Personal life
In 1988, Shimada had an affair with singer Yuya Uchida, who was married at the time. She reportedly had resorted to alcoholism and appeared in a nude photo book in 1992 in an attempt to clear her personal debts. Though the book was a bestseller, it damaged her reputation as an actress. In 2011, at the age of 58, she starred in an adult video.

Shimada died at a hospital in Tokyo on 25 July 2022, due to complications from colorectal cancer.

Filmography

Movies

Television
 Osanazuma (1970)
 Kamen Rider (1971) – Hiromi Nohara
 Karei-naru Ichizoku (1974–75) – Tsugiko Manpyo
 Shiroi Kyotō (1978)
 Ōgon no Hibi (1978) – Tama
 Shōgun (1980) – Lady Toda Buntaro – Mariko
 Chicago Story (1982) – Wing
 Sanga Moyu (1984)
 Oka no Ue no Himawari (1993)

References

External links
 

1953 births
2022 deaths
Deaths from cancer in Japan
Deaths from colorectal cancer
People from Kumamoto
Best Drama Actress Golden Globe (television) winners
20th-century Japanese actresses
21st-century Japanese actresses
Japanese film actresses
Japanese television actresses
Actors from Kumamoto Prefecture